Rossy Dahiana Burgos Herrera (born April 7, 1985 in Santo Domingo) is a volleyball and beach volleyball player from the Dominican Republic. She won the bronze medal with the women's national team at the 2005 Pan American Cup in Santo Domingo, Dominican Republic. She plays as a wing-spiker.

Career
Burgos represented her home country at the 2005 Women's U20 Volleyball World Championship, and her team finished in the 9th position. She played for the Dominican club Villa Verde in 2006.

She also participated in the 2007 NORCECA Beach Volleyball Circuit with Rosalin Angeles, finishing in the 10th position. She played for Pueblo Nuevo in 2008.

During the Holy Week Sport Festival held in Hato Mayor, Burgos played Beach Volleyball (three) with Bethania Almanzar and Karla Echenique, winning the silver medal of the event.

Trying to stay in the A2 series in their first year, the Italian club Lavoro.Doc Pontecagnano signed her for the 2009-2010 season.

She won the Most Valuable Player and Best Scorer awards, along with the gold medal, playing in Chiapas, Mexico with her National Senior Team at the 2010 Final Four Cup.

In 2017 she won the gold medal in the Hato Mayor Beach Volleyball Tournament, playing with Ana Esther Lara and Juana González. She later won the silver medal in the 2017 La Romana Reinforced Superior tournament and the gold in the Bonao Superior tournament with Plamed.

Clubs
 Modeca (2002)
 Bameso (2003–2004)
 Liga Juan Guzman (2005)
 Modeca (2005–2006)
 Villa Verde (2006)
 Lines Tra.De.Co. Altamura (2005–2006)
 Santo Domingo (2007)
 Pueblo Nuevo (2008)
 Espaillat (2008)
 La Romana (2008)
 Lavoro.Doc Pontecagnano (2009–2010)
 Espaillat (2010)
 Lava Pies (2010)
 Villa Gonzalez (2010)
 Indias de Mayagüez (2011)
 Puñal (2011)
 Universidad César Vallejo (2014-2015)
 Villaverde (2017)
 Plamed (2017)

Awards

Individuals
 2010 Final Four Cup "Most Valuable Player"
 2010 Final Four Cup "Best Scorer"

Beach volleyball
 2009 Hato Mayor Beach Volleyball Tournament  Silver Medal
 2017 Hato Mayor Beach Volleyball Tournament  Gold Medal

References

External links
 FIVB profile
 Italian League profile

1985 births
Living people
Dominican Republic women's volleyball players
Dominican Republic beach volleyball players
Women's beach volleyball players
Central American and Caribbean Games gold medalists for the Dominican Republic
Competitors at the 2010 Central American and Caribbean Games
Wing spikers
Dominican Republic expatriate sportspeople in Italy
Dominican Republic expatriate sportspeople in Puerto Rico
Dominican Republic expatriate sportspeople in Peru
Expatriate volleyball players in Italy
Expatriate volleyball players in Peru
Central American and Caribbean Games medalists in volleyball